Albert Pommier (11 January 1880, Paris – 1943, Paris) was a French sculptor.

Biography 

Born in Paris in 1880, Pommier studied at the École des Beaux Arts in Paris and was a pupil of Barrias.  From 1905 he was a regular exhibitor at the Salon des Artistes Français and in 1914 won a prize and received a grant which allowed him to travel to Algeria and study there at the Villa Abd-el-Tif, although the outbreak of the war and his mobilization meant that he could only take advantage of this fully in 1919. During the war he served as a stretcher bearer in the 3rd battalion of the 11th Infantry Regiment.  The villa Abd-el-Tif in Algeria was a villa established on similar lines to the Villa Médicis in Rome, and later the Casa de Velázquez in Madrid, to provide a location for French artists to study art – particularly Islamic art. Pommier had won the Abd-el-Tif prize, modelled on the "Prix de Rome", a joint prize and bursary and winning this prize enabled young talented artists to remain one or two years in Algiers with expenses paid.  Pommier won the grand Prix at the 1937 Exposition Internationale.

War memorials

The Hammam-Bou-Hadjar War Memorial 

The Carrara marble statue of a soldier for this Algerian memorial was one of Pommier's best known works.  Hammam-Bou-Hadjar lies some 70 kilometers south of Oran and is spa resort. Pommier was commissioned to execute the sculptural work for the memorial in 1931 and apart from the standing soldier he also created some splendid bas-reliefs for the 8-metre-high memorial's base. One bas-relief depicted a winged angel of victory holding branches of laurel. In another, two soldiers carry a dying comrade and in another two the day-to-day life of soldiers at the front is depicted. After Algerian independence the dismantlement of the memorial began and the marble plaques recording the names of the men honoured were destroyed. Successful steps were then taken to save the rest of the monument, largely led by a Mr.Montamat, who, at his own expense had the statue shipped to Toulon, via Mers-el-Kébir and it was then accepted by the mayor of  Fréjus and erected there near the military base ("Base aéronavale"). Inauguration took place on 19 April 1964. Montamat subsequently saved the war memorials of Tlemcen and Mascara. He subsequently retired to Saint-Raphaël, and played an important role in having the Mémorial National à la gloire de l'Armée d'Afrique erected in Saint-Raphaël in 1975 ".

The Oran War Memorial 

The original memorial in Oran was inaugurated on the 26 May 1927 and was erected in honour of the 12,000 men of Oran who gave their lives in the 1914-1918 war. The monument was called the "Monument de la Victoire". The architects were Dordet and Prinet and Pommier was responsible for the sculptural content involved. Carved from Magenta stone the edicice was 12 metres high with three French soldiers at the top. The inscription read 
At the monument's base the names of famous battles were listed  and on the side the inscription "Souvenez-vous" reminded the passer-by to "Remember". The memorial also listed a breakdown of the deaths being marked. 3,208 men from Oran, 1,217 men from Sidi-Bel-Abbès, 3,439 from Mostaganem, 1,136 from Tlemcen, 2,257 from Mascara and 1,252 from South Oran.

After Algeria gained her independence the decision was made to move as much of the monument as was practical and La Duchère, Lyon was chosen as a suitable site. Negotiations started in earnest in 1967 and Pommier's sculpture was shipped to Marseille on 11 December of that year. A new pedestal was built and with Pommier's three soldiers suitable installed the inauguration took place on 13 July 1968. Various plaques and inscriptions were added to the monument including

Other works

"Repentir" or "Le remords" 

This plaster statue dates to 1933 and is held in Poitiers' Musée Sainte-Croix. The bronze version is located in the St-Vincent garden by the Tour Lacataye.

Hercules and the Cretian bull 

This prize winning bronze work dates to 1937 and was commissioned for the 1937 Paris Exhibition Exposition Internationale des Arts et Techniques dans la Vie Moderne and placed on the main terrace of the Palais de Chaillot gardens.
A plaster working model is held in Poitiers'  Musee Sainte-Croix.

The bronze relief medallion "Nu" 

This work by Pommier is held by the Bourg-en-Bresse Musée de Brou.

The statue "Pomone" in Cambrai's Jardin aux fleurs 

This statue, thought to date to 1946, can be seen in this public park in Cambrai.

Bust of Mademoiselle Cesbron 

This work in bronze is held in Bordeaux' Musée des Beaux-Arts.

Decoration on the "Normandie" 

Pommier executed a large bas-relief for the ocean liner's "Deauville" suite.

"Tête de jeune fille" 

A version of this composition is held in Cholet's Musée d'art.

Medals 

Pommier was an accomplished medallist.  "La corvée de pain" in bronze was just one example.

Note

References

1880 births
1943 deaths
20th-century French sculptors
French male sculptors
Artists from Paris
French medallists
École des Beaux-Arts alumni